Aspergillus conicus is a xerophilic species of fungus in the genus Aspergillus which can cause endophthalmitis in rare cases. It was first described in 1914. It is from the section Restricti.  Aspergillus conicus has been reported as a human pathogen.

Growth and morphology

A. conicus has been cultivated on both Czapek yeast extract agar (CYA) plates and Malt Extract Agar Oxoid® (MEAOX) plates. The growth morphology of the colonies can be seen in the pictures below.

References

Further reading
 

conicus
Xerophiles
Fungi described in 1914